Jack Brunault (born January 13th, 2004) is an American actor. He is known for his leading role in the film Saving Christmas and for appearing in American Woman as well as the shows Castle Rock, SMILF, and Defending Jacob.

Life and career
Brunault was born in Norton, Massachusetts, son of Greg and Michelle Brunault and younger brother to author Rachel Brunault. 

Brunault's first movie appearance came in the movie Sex Tape (2014), where he played a 4th Grade graduate. He landed his first speaking role in the short film, Slimebuck (2015), directed by Tom DeNucci. He next played multiple roles in the short film, No Costume No Candy (2017), directed by Keith Bearden. These performances led to him playing a leading role in the 2017 film  Saving Christmas alongside Ed Asner.

Since then, he has played minor roles in the television series SMILF (2017), Castle Rock (2018), and miniseries Defending Jacob (2020). In addition, Brunault appeared in the Jake Scott movie American Woman (2018) as well as Tom DeNucci's Vault (2019).

Filmography

Film

Television

References

External links
 

2004 births
Living people
American male film actors
American male television actors
21st-century American male actors